SM UB-33 was a German Type UB II submarine or U-boat in the German Imperial Navy during World War I. The U-boat was ordered on 22 July 1915 and launched on 5 December 1915. She was commissioned into the German Imperial Navy on 22 April 1916 as SM UB-33.

The submarine sank thirteen ships, damaged two others, and took a further three as prizes in seventeen patrols.

Design
A German Type UB II submarine, UB-33 had a displacement of  when at the surface and  while submerged. The submarine was powered by two Benz six-cylinder diesel engines producing a total , two Siemens-Schuckert electric motors producing , and one propeller shaft.

UB-33 was fitted with two  torpedo tubes, four torpedoes, and one  Uk L/30 deck gun. She had a complement of twenty-one crew members and two officers and a 42-second dive time.

Fate

UB-33 was mined and sunk around the Varne Bank on 11 April 1918. The amount of clearance between the submarine and ships' keels passing directly overhead is very small, making it a risk for the heavy cross-channel ship traffic in the area. The wreck is officially classified as a war grave and therefore it cannot be deliberately destroyed.

Summary of raiding history

References

Notes

Citations

Bibliography

External links 

1915 ships
Ships built in Hamburg
World War I submarines of Germany
German Type UB II submarines
U-boats commissioned in 1916
Maritime incidents in 1918
U-boats sunk in 1918
U-boats sunk by mines
World War I shipwrecks in the English Channel
Ships lost with all hands